The Regius Professor of Medicine is an appointment held at the University of Oxford. The chair was founded by Henry VIII of England by 1546, and until the 20th century the title was Regius Professor of Physic. Henry VIII established five Regius Professorships in the University, the others being the Regius chairs of Divinity, Civil Law, Hebrew and Greek. The Regius Professor of Clinical Medicine is always a member of Christ Church.

Holders
1546–1554 John Warner 
1554–1561 Thomas Frauncis (or Frances/Francis) (c.1519–1574)
1561–1582 Walter Bayley (1529–1593)
1582–1597 Anthony Aylworth (d.1619) 
1597–1612 Bartholomew Warner (1556–1619)
1612–1647 Thomas Clayton the Elder (1575–1647), first Master of Pembroke
1647–1665 Sir Thomas Clayton the Younger (c. 1611–1693), Warden of Merton
1665–1681 James Hyde (1618–1681)
1681–1698 John Luffe (1647–1698)  
1698–1718 Thomas Hoy (b.1659, d. in or after 1721)
1718–1729 Joshua Lasher
1729–1730 William Beauvoir
1730–1758 William Woodforde
1759–1772 John Kelly
1772–1801 William Vivian
1801–1822 Sir Christopher Pegge
1822–1851 John Kidd
1851–1857 James Adey Ogle
1858–1894 Sir Henry Wentworth Acland
1895–1904 Sir John Scott Burdon-Sanderson 
1905–1919 Sir William Osler
1920–1927 Sir Archibald Garrod
1928–1943 Sir Edward Farquhar Buzzard
1943–1948 Sir Arthur William Mickle Ellis
1948–1954 Arthur Duncan Gardner
1956–1968 Sir George Pickering
1969–1979 Sir Richard Doll
1979–1992 Sir Henry Harris
1992–2000 Sir David J. Weatherall
2002– Sir John Irving Bell, incumbent

See also
 Regius Professor of Medicine (Aberdeen)
 Regius Professor of Physic (Cambridge)
 Regius Professor of Medicine (Dublin)
 Regius Professor of Medicine and Therapeutics, Glasgow

References

External links 
 Regius Professors of Medicine at Oxford

Professorships at the University of Oxford
Medicine, Oxford
Professorships in medicine
1546 establishments in England
Lists of people associated with the University of Oxford
Medical education in the United Kingdom